Criminals Gone Wild is a documentary film directed and produced by Ousala Aleem through his Brooklyn-based media studio FD Entertainment.

Content 
The film chronicled the lives of several alleged criminals on rampages of crime sprees of robberies, assaults, carjacks and murders. The film caused much controversy in the news media over the authenticity of the crimes filmed.

Production 
The film was originally released and distributed by Aleem in November 2007. The film was later distributed nationally through MVD.

Distribution
All standard copies of Criminals Gone Wild originally sold for $24.99. A deluxe edition was sold for $80 named the "crime pack combo" which included a copy of Grand Theft Auto: IV for whatever console the buyer chooses.

Amazon stopped selling the DVD and YouTube took down the film's trailer.

Sequel
A sequel called Criminals Gone Wild 2: Menace to Humanity was filmed and planned to be released in 2009 but was cancelled due to piracy and legal concerns. The film was re-cut and released in September 2018.

References

External links
 
 
 

2008 films
American documentary films
Documentary films about crime in the United States
Mondo films
2008 documentary films
Direct-to-video documentary films
2000s English-language films
2000s American films